SK Slavia Praha Ženy is a Czech women's football team from Prague representing SK Slavia Prague. It competes in the Czech First Division.

History
Slavia was a pioneer in women's football in Czechoslovakia, and won the first three editions of the Czech SR Championship between 1970 and 1972. It subsequently won six more trophies until 1989, when a final between the Czech and Slovak champions was organized. Slavia were the Czechoslovakian champions in 1992 and 1993.

However, rivals Sparta Prague gained the upper hand in the new Czech League following the dissolution of Czechoslovakia. Slavia won the championship for the first time in 2003 and played the 2003-04 UEFA Women's Cup, where it was knocked out in the group stage by defending champion Umea IK. It has always been the league's runner-up since, ranking second to Sparta. In 2011 they were close to winning their first national Cup, but lost the final to Sparta in the penalty shootout. The same happened again in 2013.

In 2014 the team won the double, ending a nine-year-old winning streak of Sparta in the league. It also marked the first time Sparta didn't win the cup.

Honours
 11 Czech SR Leagues (1970, 1971, 1972, 1974, 1975, 1979, 1983, 1987, 1988, 1992, 1993)
 8 Czech League (2003, 2004, 2014, 2015, 2016, 2017, 2020, 2022)
 3 Czech Women's Cup (2014, 2016, 2022)

Record in UEFA Competitions
All results (home and away) list Slavia's goal tally first.

Overview

Players

Current squad
As of December 2022

Former players

References

External links

Official website

Women's football clubs in the Czech Republic
SK Slavia Prague
Football clubs in Prague